In enzymology, a 2-oxoisovalerate dehydrogenase (acylating) is an enzyme that catalyzes the chemical reaction

3-methyl-2-oxobutanoate + CoA + NAD+  2-methylpropanoyl-CoA + CO2 + NADH

The 3 substrates of this enzyme are 3-methyl-2-oxobutanoate, CoA, and NAD+, whereas its 3 products are 2-methylpropanoyl-CoA, CO2, and NADH.

This enzyme belongs to the family of oxidoreductases, specifically those acting on the aldehyde or oxo group of donor with NAD+ or NADP+ as acceptor.  The systematic name of this enzyme class is 3-methyl-2-oxobutanoate:NAD+ 2-oxidoreductase (CoA-methyl-propanoylating). Other names in common use include 2-oxoisovalerate dehydrogenase, and alpha-ketoisovalerate dehydrogenase.  This enzyme participates in valine, leucine and isoleucine degradation.

References

 

EC 1.2.1
NADH-dependent enzymes
Enzymes of unknown structure